Charlotte Arter (born 18 June 1991) is a British distance athlete. Arter comes from Cumbria but represents Wales in athletics, having qualified via the residency rule. Arter previously worked for Cardiff University, managing their high performance athletics programme. She is the current Welsh record holder in the half marathon. She is the current joint women's Parkrun record holder setting a time of 15 minutes and 49 seconds at Cardiff Parkrun on 1 February 2020. She was the 2018 British 10,000m champion.

References

External links
 
 
 
 
 
 Charlotte Arter at Runbritain
 

1991 births
Living people
British long-distance runners
Parkrun